The 2003–04 Botola is the 48th season of the Moroccan Premier League. Raja Casablanca are the holders of the title.

Teams

 CODM Meknès
 Hassania Agadir
 Raja Casablanca
 Wydad Casablanca 
 Maghreb Fez
 Jeunesse Massira
 SCCM Mohammédia
 Olympique Khouribga
 AS Salé
 RS Settat
 FAR Rabat
 IZK Khemisset
 IR Tanger
 KAC Kenitra
 Mouloudia Oujda
 Kawkab Marrakech

Final league standings

Statistics
Top scorers
13 Goals
Mustapha Bidoudane - Raja Casablanca
8 Goals
Mohamed Adjou - FAR Rabat
7 Goals
Mounir Benkassou - CODM de Meknes
6 Goals
Kepa Didi - IR Tanger
Hakim Ajraoui - CODM de Meknes
Hicham Zerouali - FAR Rabat
Hassan Alla - Mouloudia Oujda
Mulingui - MAS
Best Attack
36 Goals
Raja Casablanca
FAR Rabat
AS Salé
Best Defence
8 Goals Conceded
Wydad Casablanca
17 Goals Conceded
FAR Rabat
Olympique Khouribga

External links
RSSSF competition overview

Botola seasons
Morocco
1